George Ernest Parkes (November 4, 1898 — July 7, 1948) was a Canadian professional ice hockey player and curler. He played 84 games in the Pacific Coast Hockey Association with the Vancouver Millionaires/Maroons between 1921 and 1924 and then 17 games in the National Hockey League with the Montreal Maroons during the 1924–25 season. Prior to turning professional he spent several years in the senior Ontario Hockey League. In curling, he was a member of the 1939 Macdonald Brier championship team.

Career
Parkes was born in Victoria, British Columbia, but grew up in Dunnville, Ontario. He played in the Ontario Hockey Association senior league from 1914 to 1921 and was named to the league's first all-star team in 1919 and 1920. In 1921, Parkes signed with the Pacific Coast Hockey Association's Vancouver Millionaires, where he played for three years. He then spent one season with the Montreal Maroons of the National Hockey League in 1924–25.

Parkes also curled, and played in three straight Briers for Ontario from 1938 to 1940, winning the Brier in 1939. 

Parkes died in Woodstock, Ontario, in 1948. He was survived by his wife and three children.

Career statistics

Regular season and playoffs

References

External links

1898 births
1948 deaths
Canadian ice hockey right wingers
Ice hockey people from British Columbia
Ice hockey people from Ontario
Kitchener Greenshirts players
Montreal Maroons players
Ontario Hockey Association Senior A League (1890–1979) players
Sportspeople from Haldimand County
Sportspeople from Victoria, British Columbia
Vancouver Maroons players
Vancouver Millionaires players
Canadian male curlers
Curlers from Ontario
Brier champions